A by-election was held for the New South Wales Legislative Assembly electorate of Corowa on 11 December 1937 because of the death of Richard Ball.

Dates

Result

				

The by-election was caused by the death of Richard Ball.

See also
Electoral results for the district of Corowa
List of New South Wales state by-elections

References

1937 elections in Australia
New South Wales state by-elections
1930s in New South Wales